Gilwern Hill may refer to 

Gilwern Hill, Monmouthshire, a hill near the village of Gilwern
Gilwern Hill, Powys, a hill east of Llandrindod Wells